Silent Raiders is a 1954 low budget American war film directed, starring and co-produced by Richard Bartlett. It was the first film of the L&B Production Company, consisting of Earle Lyon and Richard Bartlett.

Plot
Prior to the Dieppe Raid, seven US Army Rangers come ashore. Their mission is to destroy a German communications centre that controls the coastal guns that threaten the Canadian amphibious assault.

Cast
 Richard Bartlett as Sgt. Jack 
 Earle Lyon as Sgt. Malloy 
 Jeanette Bordeaux as French Girl 
 Earl Hansen as Pepe 
 Robert Knapp asLt. Finch 
 Dean Fredericks as Chief 
 Frank Stanlow as Horse 
 Carl Swanstrom as Wetzel

Production
Produced for $27,000 with the working titles of Dieppe Raid and Three Miles to Dawn, it was filmed in Malibu, California in 1953.

The producers were able to use composer Elmer Bernstein who was relegated to minor studios during the Hollywood blacklist period.

Notes

External links

American World War II films
1954 films
1954 drama films
1950s war drama films
American black-and-white films
American war drama films
Films directed by Richard Bartlett
Films scored by Elmer Bernstein
Lippert Pictures films
1954 directorial debut films
1950s English-language films
1950s American films